Al-Mustakfi II, (c. 1388 – 29 January 1451) was the twelfth Abbasid caliph of Cairo for the Mamluk Sultanate between 1441 and 1451. He died on Friday, 25 Zulhijja, 854 AH (29 January 1451).

Life 

In his reign, Al-Zaher also conquered the island of Rhodes twice in the era of Al-Mustaqvi once in 847 AH, and once in the following year (848 AH), in addition to the invasion that took place in the era of Mu'tazad in 844 but was unsuccessful in opening it because of the Crusader gang support of this island after the extraction of princes by the Pope and kings Europe. And the appearance on the apparent Jumaq Atabak Egypt Kerkmass Shaabani, and Sham, and the slaves Ptna in the area of Giza, but he managed to eliminate them all. The Caliph died on the third Friday of Dhu al-Hijjah in 854 AH and He was succeeded by his brother Al-Qaim.

When Ibn Hajar al-‘Asqalani died after 'Isha' (night prayer) on 8th Dhul Hijja 852 (2 February 1449), aged 79. An estimated 50,000 people attended his funeral in Cairo, including Sultan Sayf ad-Din Jaqmaq (1373-1453 CE) and Al-Mustakfi II.

References

Bibliography

1451 deaths
Cairo-era Abbasid caliphs
15th-century Abbasid caliphs
Year of birth unknown
Sons of Abbasid caliphs